The first quarter is due to air this year with the last defending champion of Season 2 will return for Season 3.

Daily rounds 
Color Key:

Contender's Information:

Results Details:

Italicized names denotes a contender is a resbaker
DW denotes contender as the daily winner
DC denotes contender as the defending champion

 *due to the semi-finals, Girlie Las Piñas (Visayas) will proceed to Quarter II.

Semifinals 
The semifinals will take place at the end of the first quarter which will determine the first two grand finalists that will take place in 2019. The two grand finalists will receive a medal and an additional 150,000 cash, while the remaining contenders will receive additional 25,000. The score will be composed of 50% coming from the judges and 50% from the text and/or online votes. A semi-finalist may be "gonged" during this stage and be eliminated from the competition.

Summary of semifinalists 

*Inclusive of bonus prizes

Semifinal results 
The first quarter of the contest covered the months from June to September. The week-long showdown took place on October 1–6, 2018.

Color Key:

Ranillo Enriquez (Visayas) and Elaine Duran (Mindanao) were declared as the first two grand finalists.

References
Notes

Scores

Sources

External links
 Tawag ng Tanghalan

Tawag ng Tanghalan seasons
2018 Philippine television seasons